"Fox" is a song by the Swedish punk rock band Millencolin from the album Pennybridge Pioneers. It was released as a single on 5 June 2000 by Burning Heart Records, including an early version of Kemp with different lyrics and two live songs were recorded at the Hi-Fi bar in Melbourne, Australia, on 15 February 2000.

Track listing
CD single
"Fox"
"Kemp" early version
"Penguins & Polarbears" (Live)
"No Cigar" (Live)

7" vinyl
Side A:
"Fox"
"Kemp" early version
Side B:
"Penguins & Polarbears" (Live)
"No Cigar" (Live)

References

Millencolin songs
2000 singles
2000 songs
Burning Heart Records singles
Songs written by Mathias Färm
Songs written by Nikola Šarčević